In Riemannian geometry and pseudo-Riemannian geometry, the Gauss–Codazzi equations (also called the Gauss–Codazzi–Weingarten-Mainardi equations or Gauss–Peterson–Codazzi Formulas) are fundamental formulas which link together the induced metric and second fundamental form of a submanifold of (or immersion into) a Riemannian or pseudo-Riemannian manifold.

The equations were originally discovered in the context of surfaces in three-dimensional Euclidean space. In this context, the first equation, often called the Gauss equation (after its discoverer Carl Friedrich Gauss), says that the Gauss curvature of the surface, at any given point, is dictated by the derivatives of the Gauss map at that point, as encoded by the second fundamental form. The second equation, called the Codazzi equation or Codazzi-Mainardi equation, states that the covariant derivative of the second fundamental form is fully symmetric. It is named for Gaspare Mainardi (1856) and Delfino Codazzi (1868–1869), who independently derived the result, although it was discovered earlier by Karl Mikhailovich Peterson.

Formal statement
Let  be an n-dimensional embedded submanifold of a Riemannian manifold P of dimension .  There is a natural inclusion of the tangent bundle of M into that of P by the pushforward, and the cokernel is the normal bundle of M:

The metric splits this short exact sequence, and so

Relative to this splitting, the Levi-Civita connection  of P decomposes into tangential and normal components.  For each  and vector field Y on M,

Let

It is often referred to as the second fundamental form.

An immediate corollary is the Gauss equation for the curvature tensor.  For ,

where  is the Riemann curvature tensor of P and R is that of M.

The Weingarten equation is an analog of the Gauss formula for a connection in the normal bundle.  Let  and  a normal vector field.  Then decompose the ambient covariant derivative of  along X into tangential and normal components:

Then
 Weingarten's equation: 
 DX is a metric connection in the normal bundle.

There are thus a pair of connections: ∇, defined on the tangent bundle of M; and D, defined on the normal bundle of M.  These combine to form a connection on any tensor product of copies of TM and T⊥M.  In particular, they defined the covariant derivative of :

The Codazzi–Mainardi equation is

Since every immersion is, in particular, a local embedding, the above formulas also hold for immersions.

Gauss–Codazzi equations in classical differential geometry

Statement of classical equations
In classical differential geometry of surfaces, the Codazzi–Mainardi equations are expressed via the second fundamental form (L, M, N):

The Gauss formula, depending on how one chooses to define the Gaussian curvature, may be a tautology. It can be stated as

where (e, f, g) are the components of the first fundamental form.

Derivation of classical equations
Consider a parametric surface in Euclidean 3-space,

where the three component functions depend smoothly on ordered pairs (u,v) in some open domain U in the uv-plane.  Assume that this surface is regular, meaning that the vectors ru and rv are linearly independent.  Complete this to a basis{ru,rv,n}, by selecting a unit vector n normal to the surface. It is possible to express the second partial derivatives of r (vectors of ) with the Christoffel symbols and the elements of the second fundamental form. We choose the first two components of the basis as they are intrinsic to the surface and intend to prove intrinsic property of the Gaussian curvature. The last term in the basis is extrinsic.

Clairaut's theorem states that partial derivatives commute:

If we differentiate ruu with respect to v and ruv with respect to u, we get:

Now substitute the above expressions for the second derivatives and equate the coefficients of n:

Rearranging this equation gives the first Codazzi–Mainardi equation.

The second equation may be derived similarly.

Mean curvature

Let M be a smooth m-dimensional manifold immersed in the (m + k)-dimensional smooth manifold P.  Let  be a local orthonormal frame of vector fields normal to M.  Then we can write,

If, now,  is a local orthonormal frame (of tangent vector fields) on the same open subset of M, then we can define the mean curvatures of the immersion by

In particular, if M is a hypersurface of P, i.e. , then there is only one mean curvature to speak of.

Observe that the mean curvature is a trace, or average, of the second fundamental form, for any given component.

We can now write the Gauss–Codazzi equations as

Contracting the  components gives us

When M is a hypersurface, this simplifies to

In that case, one more contraction yields,

If , the scalar curvature equation might be more complicated.

We can already use these equations to draw some conclusions.  For example, any minimal immersion into the round sphere  must be of the form

See also
 Darboux frame

Notes

References
Historical references
 
 
  ("General Discussions about Curved Surfaces")
 
 
 
.
Textbooks
 do Carmo, Manfredo P. Differential geometry of curves & surfaces. Revised & updated second edition. Dover Publications, Inc., Mineola, NY, 2016. xvi+510 pp. 
 do Carmo, Manfredo Perdigão. Riemannian geometry. Translated from the second Portuguese edition by Francis Flaherty. Mathematics: Theory & Applications. Birkhäuser Boston, Inc., Boston, MA, 1992. xiv+300 pp. 
 Kobayashi, Shoshichi; Nomizu, Katsumi. Foundations of differential geometry. Vol. II. Interscience Tracts in Pure and Applied Mathematics, No. 15 Vol. II Interscience Publishers John Wiley & Sons, Inc., New York-London-Sydney 1969 xv+470 pp.
 O'Neill, Barrett. Semi-Riemannian geometry. With applications to relativity. Pure and Applied Mathematics, 103. Academic Press, Inc. [Harcourt Brace Jovanovich, Publishers], New York, 1983. xiii+468 pp. 
V. A. Toponogov. Differential geometry of curves and surfaces. A concise guide. Birkhauser Boston, Inc., Boston, MA, 2006. xiv+206 pp. ; .Articles

 Simons, James. Minimal varieties in riemannian manifolds.'' Ann. of Math. (2) 88 (1968), 62–105.

External links
Peterson–Mainardi–Codazzi Equations – from Wolfram MathWorld
Peterson–Codazzi Equations

Differential geometry of surfaces
Riemannian geometry
Curvature (mathematics)
Surfaces